Demetrius the Chronographer (or Demetrius the Chronicler) was a Jewish chronicler (historian) of the late 3rd century BC, who lived probably in Alexandria and wrote in Greek.

Works
His text is almost lost and only a few fragments have survived in the following ancient texts: Eusebius's Praeparatio Evangelica, (for fragments 1-5), the Stromata of Clement of Alexandria and in quotations from the book About Jews of the historian Alexander Polyhistor (used by Eusebius).

From the orthography of proper names, and from various expressions used, it is evident that Demetrius used the Septuagint text of the Bible. For the determination of certain dates he relied on the Biblical exegesis in use among the Palestinian Jews. Josephus used Demetrius' chronicles for his Antiquities of the Jews and adopted his chronological system.

Demetrius is not an apologist in the usual meaning: his main focus is patriarchal chronology, and there is no attention given to theological matters.

Fragments
There are six  fragments usually considered Demetrius' work. The first short fragment (found in Praeparatio Evangelica 9.19.4) is about the sacrifice of Isaac.

The second fragment is the longest we have. It is found in Praeparatio Evangelica 9.21.1-19 and deals with the history of Jacob from the time of his emigration to Mesopotamia till his death. Demetrius endeavors to establish the Biblical chronology and gives the date of every incident in Jacob's life, even fixing the year and month in which each of Jacob's children was born. The excerpt concludes with the genealogy of Levi down to the birth of Aaron and Moses.

The third fragment (Praeparatio Evangelica 9.29.1-3) is an extract from the history of Moses, laying stress on the genealogy of Jethro in order to demonstrate that Zipporah, the wife of Moses, was a descendant of Abraham and Keturah. The fourth fragment (Praeparatio Evangelica 9.29.15) gives an account of the sweetening of the water of Marah. Fragment five (Praeparatio Evangelica 9.29.15-end) is very short and is about Israelites's weapons referred to in chapter 14 of Exodus.

The last fragment was preserved by Clement of Alexandria (Stromata i. 21, 141), who gives the title of Demetrius' chronicles as Περὶ τῶν ἐν τῇ Ἰουδαίᾳ Βασιλέων (On the Kings of Judea). This fragment endeavors to determine exactly the period of the exile of the Ten Lost Tribes, and that of the tribes of Judah and Benjamin till Ptolemy IV Philopator, in whose reign Demetrius evidently lived.

Date and proveniance
Fragment 6 refers to Ptolemy IV (c. 221-204 B.C.); hence Demetrius'work is dated to his reign and placed in Egypt. Demetrius was the earliest Jewish author writing in Greek.

Notes

References
Bickerman, Elias J., The Jewish historian Demetrios, In: Christianity, Judaism and Other Greco-Roman Cults, III (1975) pp. 72–84

External links
Article on JewishEncyclopedia
Article on EarlyJewishWritings
Fragments in English Translation

3rd-century BC historians
Jews of Ptolemaic Alexandria
Hellenistic Jewish writers
Hellenistic-era historians
Ancient Egyptian historians